Pham Doan Trang (born 1978 in Hanoi) is a Vietnamese author, blogger, journalist, publisher, and democracy activist. She received the 2017 Homo Homini Award from People In Need, who called her "one of the leading figures of the contemporary Vietnamese dissent".

Work and recognition
Trang is the co-founder of the blog Luat Khoa Tap Chi (Journal of Law). In 2017, she published Chính Trị Bình Dân (Politics for Everyone), her ninth book. Her blog receives around 20,000 daily visitors. Since then, she has sought refuge at an undisclosed location, where she also speaks to the media.

She is also the co-founder of the publishing house Nhà xuất bản Tự Do (Liberal Publishing House) which in 2020 was awarded the International Publishers Association's IPA Prix Voltaire.

In 2018, Trang was awarded the Homo Homini Award by the Czech-based human rights organisation People In Need. She was lauded for using "plain words to fight the lack of freedom, corruption and the despotism of the communist regime".

In 2022, Trang received the International Women of Courage Award from the United States Department of State.

Arrests 
According to Reporters Without Borders (RSF), Trang was detained under de facto house arrest in February 2018. Her treatment by the government has been condemned by RSF.

On October 7, 2020, she was arrested by Hanoi police and the Ministry of Public Security Officers in Ho Chi Minh City for "making, storing, spreading information, materials, items for the purpose of opposing the State of the Socialist Republic of Vietnam". She has been charged under Article 117 of the penal code for "propaganda against the State", and faces a maximum sentence of 20 years in jail if convicted. In late-2021, she was sentenced to 9 years imprisonment. Amnesty International called the conviction "outrageous," saying that her treatment by the Vietnamese government "encompassing harassment, surveillance, threats, torture and bogus prosecutions, is cruelly emblematic of the Vietnamese authorities’ repression of peaceful human rights activism across the country."

References

1978 births
Living people
People from Hanoi
Vietnamese democracy activists
Vietnamese dissidents
Vietnamese writers
Vietnamese bloggers
Vietnamese women writers
Vietnamese women activists
Vietnamese women bloggers
Recipients of the International Women of Courage Award